The William A. McHenry House, Denison, Iowa, is on the National Register of Historic Places. It is maintained as a museum by the Crawford County Historical Society and is open for tours.

The Oscar of Donna Reed who won the Academy Award for Best Supporting Actress in 1953 is on display at William A. McHenry House.

References

External links
 McHenry House - City of Denison information

National Register of Historic Places in Crawford County, Iowa
Houses on the National Register of Historic Places in Iowa
Museums in Crawford County, Iowa
Queen Anne architecture in Iowa
Shingle Style architecture in Iowa
Houses completed in 1886
Shingle Style houses
Historic house museums in Iowa
Houses in Crawford County, Iowa
Denison, Iowa